The Journal of Food Quality is a peer-reviewed scientific journal that publishes research "on the handling of food from a quality and sensory perspective." It was established in 1977 and is published by Wiley-Blackwell. The journal moved to online-only publication in 2011.

References

External links 
 

Bimonthly journals
Wiley-Blackwell academic journals
English-language journals
Publications established in 1977
Food science journals
Hindawi Publishing Corporation academic journals